Karma is an urban-type settlement and the center of Karma District, in the Gomel Region of Belarus.

References

Urban-type settlements in Belarus
Populated places in Gomel Region